Ony Uhiara (born 1978/79), is an actress, best known for playing Adele in the BBC sitcom, The Crouches, which was broadcast from 2003 until 2004.

She was born in the UK of Nigerian descent and grew up in east London. Ony is the sister of Ofo Uhiara, best known for his role as PC Lance Powell in The Bill.  In 2002, Ony graduated from the Guildhall School of Music and Drama.

Filmography
 The Bill in episode 313 as Letitia Watson.
 The Crouches (2003–2005) - Adele Crouch
 Doctors (series 8, ep 16) - Kelly Stone
 Holby City (2004) - Amina Dukuze
 Hunter (series 1, ep 1) - Chloe
 Murder Investigation Team (2005)
 Proof (2005/6) - Tessa Kuria
 Rosemary & Thyme : Three Legs Good (2006) - Grace Oluwu
 Waking the Dead (2003) - Janice
 The State (2017 TV series)

Theatre
 The title role in Anna Karenina adapted by Jo Clifford. At the Royal Exchange, Manchester (Co-production with West Yorkshire Playhouse) directed by Ellen McDougall (2015)
 Naome in The Rolling Stone by Chris Urch. At the Royal Exchange, Manchester (Co-production with West Yorkshire Playhouse) directed by Ellen McDougall (2015)
  Cannibals by Rory Mullarkey (2013) - The Royal Exchange, Manchester - Lizaveta
 Much Ado About Nothing by William Shakespeare (2011) -  Shakespeare's Globe - Hero
 Noughts & Crosses by Malorie Blackman (2008) - Royal Shakespeare Company - Sephy

References

External links

Living people
1978 births
Alumni of the Guildhall School of Music and Drama
Black British actresses
English people of Nigerian descent
Actresses from London
English television actresses